Pachycephala is a genus of birds native to Oceania and Southeast Asia. They are commonly known as typical whistlers. Older guidebooks may refer to them as thickheads, a literal translation of the generic name, which is derived from the Ancient Greek terms pachys "thick" + kephale "head". This lineage originated in Australo-Papua and later colonized the
Indonesian and Philippine archipelagos to the west and the Pacific archipelagos to the east.

Taxonomy and systematics

Extant species
There are forty-eight species of whistlers:
 Olive whistler (Pachycephala olivacea)
 Red-lored whistler (Pachycephala rufogularis)
 Gilbert's whistler (Pachycephala inornata)
 Mangrove whistler (Pachycephala cinerea)
 Biak whistler (Pachycephala melanorhyncha)
 Green-backed whistler (Pachycephala albiventris)
 White-vented whistler (Pachycephala homeyeri)
 Island whistler (Pachycephala phaionota)
 Rusty whistler (Pachycephala hyperythra)
 Brown-backed whistler (Pachycephala modesta)
 Yellow-bellied whistler (Pachycephala philippinensis)
 Sulphur-vented whistler (Pachycephala sulfuriventer)
 Bornean whistler (Pachycephala hypoxantha)
 Vogelkop whistler (Pachycephala meyeri)
 Grey whistler (Pachycephala simplex)
 Fawn-breasted whistler (Pachycephala orpheus)
 Sclater's whistler (Pachycephala soror)
 Rusty-breasted whistler (Pachycephala fulvotincta)
 Yellow-throated whistler (Pachycephala macrorhyncha)
 Baliem whistler (Pachycephala balim)
 Black-chinned whistler (Pachycephala mentalis)
 Australian golden whistler (Pachycephala pectoralis)
 Western whistler (Pachycephala fuliginosa)
 Bismarck whistler (Pachycephala citreogaster)
 Oriole whistler (Pachycephala orioloides)
 Louisiade whistler (Pachycephala collaris)
 Rennell whistler (Pachycephala feminina)
 Melanesian whistler (Pachycephala chlorura)
 New Caledonian whistler (Pachycephala caledonica)
 Fiji whistler (Pachycephala vitiensis)
 Temotu whistler (Pachycephala vanikorensis)
 Tongan whistler (Pachycephala jacquinoti)
 Mangrove golden whistler (Pachycephala melanura)
 Samoan whistler (Pachycephala flavifrons)
 Hooded whistler (Pachycephala implicata)
 Bougainville whistler (Pachycephala richardsi)
 Bare-throated whistler (Pachycephala nudigula)
 Lorentz's whistler (Pachycephala lorentzi)
 Regent whistler (Pachycephala schlegelii)
 Golden-backed whistler (Pachycephala aurea)
 Rufous whistler (Pachycephala rufiventris)
 Black-headed whistler (Pachycephala monacha)
 White-bellied whistler (Pachycephala leucogastra)
 Wallacean whistler (Pachycephala arctitorquis)
 Drab whistler (Pachycephala griseonota)
 Cinnamon-breasted whistler (Pachycephala johni)
 White-breasted whistler (Pachycephala lanioides)
 Morningbird (Pachycephala tenebrosa)

Former species
Formerly, some authorities also considered the following species (or subspecies) as species within the genus Pachycephala:
 Maroon-backed whistler (as Pachycephala raveni)
 Little shrikethrush (fortis) (as Pachycephala fortis)

An unidentified Pachycephala whistler was heard on May 14, 1994 at 1,000 meters ASL south of the summit of Camiguin in the Philippines, where the genus was not previously known to occur. It might have been an undescribed taxon, or simply a vagrant of a known species.

References

 
Bird genera